Bega Khurd, also spelled Beega Khurd, is a small village located in Wazirabad Tehsil, Gujranwala District, Punjab, Pakistan.

Demography 
Bega Khurd has a population of over 400 and is located about 28 kilometres northwest of Gujranwala city.

Education 
The village's government schools are operated by the Government of Punjab, Pakistan under the Board of Intermediate and Secondary Education, Gujranwala. For a higher level of education, some student move to Kalaske Cheema and some to Ahmad Nagar Chattha, for a higher university level education people move to Gujranwala and Gujrat, Pakistan. Some private institute are also located in the area.

 Government Girls Primary School (GGPS), Bega Khurd
 Government Boys Primary School (GPS), Bega Khurd
 Some NGOs and people on their own are organizing various social development projects driving under Zain ul Abidin for prosperity and basic development of villagers.

Various overseas Pakistani are funding the charity programs in order to supply basic needs of their people.

Communication 
The way to get Bega Khurd is by road, by car it takes about 37 minutes from Gujranwala. The Wazirabad-Faisalabad rail link is the only nearest railway line.

See also 

 Hassan Wali
 Bara Pind

References 

Villages in Gujranwala District